Vuyisile Promise Malomane is a South African politician and a member of the National Assembly of South Africa from Mpumalanga. She is a member of the African National Congress.

Parliamentary career
Malomane was placed 12th on the ANC's list of candidates from Mpumalanga for the National Assembly ahead of the 2019 provincial and national elections. At the election, she won a seat in the National Assembly. Upon election, she became a member of the  Portfolio Committee on Public Service and Administration, Performance Monitoring & Evaluation and the  Portfolio Committee on Sports, Arts and Culture.

On 20 September 2019, Malomane received a standing ovation from Democratic Alliance MPs for defending Afrikaans during a speech ahead of Heritage Day.

References

External links
Profile at Parliament of South Africa

Living people
Year of birth missing (living people)
Place of birth missing (living people)
People from Mpumalanga
African National Congress politicians
Members of the National Assembly of South Africa
Women members of the National Assembly of South Africa